3-Chlorophthalic anhydride is a monochlorinated aromatic anhydride. It is an isomer of 4-chlorophthalic anhydride and a derivative of phthalic anhydride.

Properties 
3-Chlorophthalic anhydride has a melting point of around 123 °C. It may hydrolize in presence of water.

Applications 
3-Chlorophthalic anhydride may be used to produce herbicides and pesticides, intermediates for active pharmaceutical ingredients and can be used as a monomer for the production of polyimides.

See also 
 4-Chlorophthalic anhydride

References 
  Preparation of 3-chlorophthalic anhydride  http://www.freepatentsonline.com/5683553.html

Chloroarenes
Phthalic anhydrides